The 8th Tactical Fighter Squadron is a squadron of the 8th Air Wing of the Japan Air Self-Defense Force based at Tsuiki Air Base, in Fukuoka Prefecture, Japan. It is equipped with Mitsubishi F-2 and Kawasaki T-4 aircraft.

History

Tail markings

The squadron's tail marking is of a black leopard.

In popular culture
The squadron appeared in the 1993 anime film Patlabor 2: The Movie and in the 2016 film Shin Godzilla.

Aircraft operated

Fighter aircraft
 North American F-86F Sabre (1960-1980)
 Mitsubishi F-1 (1980-1997)
 McDonnell Douglas F-4EJ Kai (1997-2009)
 Mitsubishi F-2 (2008-present)

Liaison aircraft
 Lockheed T-33A (1959-1992)
 Mitsubishi T-2 (1981-2006)
 Kawasaki T-4 (1991-present)

See also
 Fighter units of the Japan Air Self-Defense Force

References

Units of the Japan Air Self-Defense Force